Jeffrey Craig Kuhlman (born 1963) is an American medical doctor and former Physician to the President under Barack Obama. He attended medical school at Loma Linda University and completed his residency at Loma Linda University Medical Center.

Following his retirement from the Navy, Kuhlman took the position of Senior Vice President & Associate Chief Medical Officer at Florida Hospital.

References

External links

1963 births
Living people
Physicians to the President
Johns Hopkins Bloomberg School of Public Health alumni
Loma Linda University alumni
Southern Methodist University alumni
United States Navy Medical Corps officers
People from Winter Park, Florida
United States Navy captains